Harris-Chilton-Ruble House, also known as the Chilton House, is a historic home located at New Franklin, Howard County, Missouri.  It was built about 1832, and is a two-story, three bay, Federal style brick dwelling.  It has a gable roof with projecting
cornice and a Victorian era front porch.

It was listed on the National Register of Historic Places in 1982.

References

Houses on the National Register of Historic Places in Missouri
Federal architecture in Missouri
Houses completed in 1832
Buildings and structures in Howard County, Missouri
National Register of Historic Places in Howard County, Missouri